NSPW may stand for:

 National Society of Pottery Workers, former British trade union
 National Suicide Prevention Week, annual campaign in the United States